Holger Zander (born 24 May 1943) was a West German-German sprint canoeist who competed in the 1960s. Competing in two Summer Olympics, he won two medals at Tokyo in 1964 with a silver in the K-4 1000 m and a bronze in the K-2 1000 m.

Zander also won two medals for West Germany in the K-2 500 m event at the ICF Canoe Sprint World Championships with a silver in 1966 and a bronze in 1963.

References

1943 births
Canoeists at the 1964 Summer Olympics
Canoeists at the 1968 Summer Olympics
German male canoeists
Living people
Olympic canoeists of the United Team of Germany
Olympic canoeists of West Germany
Olympic silver medalists for the United Team of Germany
Olympic bronze medalists for the United Team of Germany
Olympic medalists in canoeing
ICF Canoe Sprint World Championships medalists in kayak
Medalists at the 1964 Summer Olympics